Riva and Padial's fan-footed gecko (Ptyodactylus rivapadiali) is a species of gecko. It is endemic to Mauritania.

References

Ptyodactylus
Reptiles described in 2017